It's Not Easy is an American sitcom that aired on ABC from September 29 until October 27, 1983.

Premise
A divorced couple decides to live across the street from each other to make it easier for the kids.

Cast
Evan Cohen as Johnny Long
Bert Convy as Neal Townsend
Ken Howard as Jack Long
Rachel Jacobs as Carol Long
Billy Jayne as Matthew Townsend
Jayne Meadows as Ruth Long
Carlene Watkins as Sharon Long Townsend

Development
The series was picked up by ABC in the spring of 1982, with it set to premiere that fall. Gerald McRaney was originally cast as Jack Long, with Larry Breeding co-starring as Neal Townsend. McRaney signed on for It's Not Easy when it appeared that his CBS detective series Simon & Simon was on the cancellation block. A test pilot was shot with McRaney and Breeding, and after ABC picked up the show, the project soon faced recasts. Shortly after ABC ordered episodes for the fall, CBS announced that Simon & Simon was renewed for the 1982-83 season, rendering McRaney unavailable. The producers then sought out a replacement while ABC moved It's Not Easy off the September schedule. By late in the summer, Ken Howard was chosen to replace McRaney. Plans were moving forward to shoot a second pilot when Larry Breeding was killed in a car accident on the Hollywood Freeway on September 28, 1982, and dealing with his loss preempted the show's development for several more months. It's Not Easy finally resurfaced on ABC's development slate in the spring of 1983, with Bert Convy taking over the role of Neal Townsend, and with a fall premiere date that year. The show did not last and was cancelled after only five weeks on air.

Episodes

References

External links

1983 American television series debuts
1983 American television series endings
1980s American sitcoms
English-language television shows
American Broadcasting Company original programming
Television series by 20th Century Fox Television
Television shows set in New Jersey